Thierry Déau is the founder, chairman and chief executive officer of Meridiam, a leading independent global investor and asset manager specialized in developing, financing and managing long-term public infrastructure projects.

Career
After graduating from France’s engineering school l'Ecole nationale des Ponts et Chaussées, Déau began his career in Malaysia with the construction firm GTM International. He then joined France’s Caisse des Dépôts et Consignations, where he held several positions within its investment and development subsidiary Egis Projects, from Project Manager in Manila, Philippines, then Director of Concession Projects in Paris to his appointment as Chief Executive Officer of Egis in 2001.

During his tenure at Egis he headed up international operations for the Egis Group executive committee, served on its risk management committee and acted as Member and Chairman on the boards of several subsidiaries.

In 2004, before founding Meridiam, Déau joined AECOM Technology as Director.

In 2005, Déau established Meridiam, with operational and financial support from AECOM Technology and the Crédit Agricole Group. He is currently Meridiam’s Chairman and Chief Executive Officer, as well as its main shareholder.

In 2017, the world’s largest international operator of cruise ports, Global Ports Holding, appointed Déau to its board as it prepared for an expected listing on the London Stock Exchange.

Other activities
 European Council on Foreign Relations (ECFR), Member (since 2021)
 Long Term Infrastructure Investors Association in France, Chair

From 2019 to 2020, Déau served on the Transatlantic Task Force of the German Marshall Fund and the Bundeskanzler-Helmut-Schmidt-Stiftung (BKHS), co-chaired by Karen Donfried and Wolfgang Ischinger.

Notes

Further reading

Opinion pieces

Interviews

External links
 www.meridiam.com

French chief executives
Year of birth missing (living people)
Living people